Mount Victory is a village in Hardin County, Ohio, United States. The population was 627 at the 2010 census. It is home to a quaint downtown main street along busy State Route 31 between Marysville and Kenton, and to a volunteer fire department.

History
The town site of Mount Victory was surveyed in 1851, one year before the railroad was extended to that point. The village received its name by reason of the proprietor shouting "Victory!" when he obtained the land. A post office has been in operation at Mount Victory since 1854.

The Ridgemont FFA is a prominent youth development organization at the Ridgemont High School. The FFA is one of the only chapters in the United States to be named back to back winners of the National Model of Innovation. The high school members won the titles for their work in their school, community, and FFA chapter. In 2010 and 2011, the small chapter was named #1 Model of Innovation in the Nation for their great work.

Geography
Mount Victory is located at  (40.534164, -83.520156).

Demographics

2010 census
As of the census of 2010, there were 627 people, 249 households, and 172 families living in the village. The racial makeup of the village was 98.1% White, 0.6% African American, 0.5% Asian, 0.5% from other races, and 0.3% from two or more races. Hispanic or Latino of any race were 1.1% of the population.

There were 249 households, of which 34.1% had children under the age of 18 living with them, 53.8% were married couples living together, 9.6% had a female householder with no husband present, 5.6% had a male householder with no wife present, and 30.9% were non-families. 24.9% of all households were made up of individuals, and 8% had someone living alone who was 65 years of age or older. The average household size was 2.52 and the average family size was 2.95.

The median age in the village was 37.3 years. 25.4% of residents were under the age of 18; 8.3% were between the ages of 18 and 24; 25.1% were from 25 to 44; 24.9% were from 45 to 64; and 16.3% were 65 years of age or older. The gender makeup of the village was 49.3% male and 50.7% female.

2000 census
As of the census of 2000, there were 600 people, 245 households, and 171 families living in the village. The population density was 791.3 people per square mile (304.8/km2). There were 263 housing units at an average density of 346.8 per square mile (133.6/km2). The racial makeup of the village was 98.83% White, 0.17% African American, and 1.00% from two or more races. Hispanic or Latino of any race were 0.83% of the population.

There were 245 households, out of which 32.7% had children under the age of 18 living with them, 51.8% were married couples living together, 12.2% had a female householder with no husband present, and 30.2% were non-families. 25.7% of all households were made up of individuals, and 11.0% had someone living alone who was 65 years of age or older. The average household size was 2.45 and the average family size was 2.86.

In the village, the population was spread out, with 25.5% under the age of 18, 9.8% from 18 to 24, 28.8% from 25 to 44, 21.2% from 45 to 64, and 14.7% who were 65 years of age or older. The median age was 35 years. For every 100 females there were 92.9 males. For every 100 females age 18 and over, there were 93.5 males.

The median income for a household in the village was $40,694, and the median income for a family was $47,273. Males had a median income of $33,571 versus $22,344 for females. The per capita income for the village was $17,745. About 3.8% of families and 6.9% of the population were below the poverty line, including 6.1% of those under age 18 and 10.8% of those age 65 or over.

References

External links
 Mount Victory, Ohio

Villages in Hardin County, Ohio
Villages in Ohio
1851 establishments in Ohio
Populated places established in 1851